Events from the year 1503 in India.

Events
 January – Battle of Calicut
 March – August – First siege of Cochin (1503)
 Kingdom of Kochi is taken over by the Portuguese creating the first European settlement in India
 Unniraman Koyikal I reign as King of Cochin ends
 Unniraman Koyikal II reign as King of Cochin begins
The Portuguese army under Commander Dom Afonso de Albuquerque who reached Cochin in 1503, defeated the enemies of the King of Cochin and in return he gave them permission to build a fort in Kochi
The Casa de Contratación was founded by Queen Isabella I of Castile in 1503, eleven years after the discovery of the Americas in 1492.
Diogo Fernandes Pereira visited Socotra, the first European to do so, and he discovered the Mascarenes archipelago

Establishments
 Pallipuram Fort established by the Portuguese in Kerala
 St. Francis Church, in Kochi, Kerala, the oldest European church in India

Births
 Gopala Bhatta Goswami, one of the goswamis of Vrindavana is born (dies 1578)

Deaths
 Tuluva Narasa Nayaka, Vijayanagar commander and prime minister

See also
 Timeline of Indian history

References

 
India